Malvinas Argentinas Stadium is a stadium in the city of Mendoza in the homonymous province of Argentina. With a seating capacity of 42,000 spectators, the stadium is the largest in Mendoza. Built for the 1978 FIFA World Cup, It is owned and administrated by the Provincial Government.

The venue is mostly used for association football matches, although it has hosted some rugby union games during The Rugby Championship, as well as music concerts. In Primera División matches, local club Godoy Cruz plays their home matches at Malvinas Argentinas in some occasions.

History 

Argentina was chosen as the host nation of the 1978 World Cup by FIFA in London, England on 6 July 1966. Mendoza, as one of the largest cities in the country, was selected as a venue. The organizing committee, under supervision of the military dictatorship that ruled Argentina since 1976, proposed a new stadium to be built by the Cerro de la Gloria, in General San Martín Park, taking advantage of the topography of a natural depression located on the slopes of the hill. Beside the stadium itself, the project included new access roads, parking lots, a training auxiliar field and other complementary works.

The stadium was designed by Uruguayan Rafael Viñoly, and its construction began in 1976. Originally named "Estadio Ciudad de Mendoza" ("City of Mendoza Stadium") it was opened on May 14, 1978 with a friendly match between a team formed by players from Mendoza and another one with players from San Rafael. During June 1978, Mendoza hosted six Fifa World Cup matches, three first round matches and three second round matches. That same year Gimnasia y Esgrima de Mendoza became the first team from Mendoza to play a first division match at the stadium. Other teams from Mendoza that have reached the first division and used the Malvinas Argentinas as a home stadium since are Independiente Rivadavia, Huracán Las Heras, San Martín de Mendoza, and Godoy Cruz.

After the 1982 Falklands War, the stadium was renamed "Estadio Malvinas Argentinas". The new name reflects Argentina's false claims of sovereignty over the Falkland Islands (Islas Malvinas in Spanish).

During the 1993–94 Primera División season Argentinos Juniors, original from Buenos Aires, played their home matches in Malvinas Argentinas stadium after an agreement signed with sports communications company Torneos y Competencias. TyC offered Argentinos Juniors (which had serious financial problems in those times) to hire several players loaning them to the club. In return, Argentinos had to move to Mendoza to play their home games so TyC considered there were more supporters in that Province than in Buenos Aires. Nevertheless, things do not work out as expected and the experience was unsuccessful with low attendances and money losses.

In 1994, Mendoza started hosting the annual Torneos de Verano (Summer Tournaments), hosting several editions of the competition. In 2011, Godoy Cruz qualified for the Copa Libertadores and the stadium hosted for the first time an international club competition. The Mendocenean club qualified to the most important continental tournament once again in 2012 and took part of the 2011 and 2014 Copa Sudamericana; Godoy Cruz has played all of its home matches for international competitions at the Malvinas Argentinas stadium. In the 2016–17 season, Godoy Cruz drew an average home league attendance of 16,000.

Renovation 
The stadium was renovated for the 2011 Copa América held in Argentina. Among other works during the renovation all the seats were replaced, the bathrooms were reconstructed, the roof of the stadium was repaired and a new 128 m2 LED screen was installed, being during that time the largest of its kind in South America.

Sporting events 
The stadium was built for the 1978 FIFA World Cup and during June 1978 Mendoza it hosted six matches, three group 4 matches and three second round matches.

1978 FIFA World Cup 

Apart from the 1978 FIFA World Cup, Malvinas Argentinas stadium has hosted several sporting events, being one of the venues for the 2001 FIFA World Youth Championship, the 2011 Copa América and the 2013 South American Youth Football Championship.

The Argentina national football team has played several friendly matches in Mendoza but only one official match: it was on 2012 against Uruguay for the 2014 FIFA World Cup qualification.

Local team Godoy Cruz used the Malvinas Argentinas as venue during their home matches in the 2011 and 2017 Copa Libertadores, and 2011 Copa Sudamericana. The stadium also hosted several Copa Argentina matches, and the 2017 Supercopa Argentina.

Rugby union 
Estadio Malvinas Argentinas has hosted several rugby union games, most of them Argentina tests and some Cuyo RU team against touring sides.

On the other hand, the final and 3rd place match of the 2005 Under 21 Rugby World Championship were played at this stadium, while the rest of the tournament was held in smaller different stadiums of Mendoza province.

Concerts 
The stadium played host to Amnesty International's Human Rights Now! Benefit Concert on October 14, 1988. The show was headlined by Sting and Peter Gabriel and also featured Bruce Springsteen & The E Street Band, Tracy Chapman and Youssou N'Dour.

Other artists that have played at the Malvinas Argentinas are Soda Stereo (1989), Fito Páez (1989), Luis Miguel (1999), Charly García (2000), Divididos (2003), Ricky Martin (2007), Joaquín Sabina with Joan Manuel Serrat (2007), Chayanne (2007), Maná (2011), and Ricardo Arjona (2014),

The main event of the 2012 Fiesta Nacional de la Vendimia was held at this stadium.

See also
 List of association football stadiums by capacity

References

External links

 

Malvinas Argentinas
Malvinas Argentinas
Malvinas Argentinas
Rugby union stadiums in Argentina
Buildings and structures in Mendoza Province
Sport in Mendoza, Argentina
1978 establishments in Argentina
Sports venues completed in 1978